Ko Jae-Sung  (born 28 January 1985) is a South Korean footballer, who currently plays as defensive-midfielder for Semen Padang FC. Based upon his speed and diligence, he can play as Shadow striker ( for anyone wondering it’s a false 9 type cam), Midfielder (AM), Winger (Both of AM and DM).

On 22 February 2011, Ko signed for Chinese club Nanchang Hengyuan in the Chinese Super League on a one-year deal.

Club career statistics

Honors

Club
Seongnam Ilhwa Chunma
AFC Champions League (1): 2010

References

External links 

1985 births
Living people
Association football midfielders
South Korean footballers
South Korean expatriate footballers
Suwon FC players
Seongnam FC players
Shanghai Shenxin F.C. players
Gyeongnam FC players
Gimcheon Sangmu FC players
Busan IPark players
Korea National League players
K League 1 players
K League 2 players
Chinese Super League players
Expatriate footballers in China
South Korean expatriate sportspeople in China